Küdinghoven is a Bonn Stadtbahn (tram) stop served by lines 62 and 65, in Bonn, Germany.

References

Bonn Straßenbahn stations